Nathaniel Lightner was an American politician. He served as the third mayor of Lancaster, Pennsylvania from 1824 to 1830.

References

Mayors of Lancaster, Pennsylvania